Nepenthes densiflora is a tropical pitcher plant endemic to Sumatra, where it grows at an altitude of between 1700 and 3200 m above sea level.

No forms or varieties of N. densiflora have been described.

Taxonomy

In 2001, Charles Clarke performed a cladistic analysis of the Nepenthes species of Sumatra and Peninsular Malaysia using 70 morphological characteristics of each taxon. The following is part of the resultant cladogram, showing "Clade 3", which comprises N. densiflora and three other related species.

Natural hybrids

The following natural hybrids involving N. densiflora have been recorded.

N. angasanensis × N. densiflora

References

Further reading

 Bauer, U., C.J. Clemente, T. Renner & W. Federle 2012. Form follows function: morphological diversification and alternative trapping strategies in carnivorous Nepenthes pitcher plants. Journal of Evolutionary Biology 25(1): 90–102. 
 Clarke, C.M. 2006. Introduction. In: Danser, B.H. The Nepenthaceae of the Netherlands Indies. Natural History Publications (Borneo), Kota Kinabalu. pp. 1–15.
 Hernawati & P. Akhriadi 2006. A Field Guide to the Nepenthes of Sumatra. PILI-NGO Movement, Bogor.
  Mansur, M. 2001. Koleksi Nepenthes di Herbarium Bogoriense: prospeknya sebagai tanaman hias. In: Prosiding Seminar Hari Cinta Puspa dan Satwa Nasional. Lembaga Ilmu Pengetahuan Indonesia, Bogor. pp. 244–253. 
 Meimberg, H., A. Wistuba, P. Dittrich & G. Heubl 2001. Molecular phylogeny of Nepenthaceae based on cladistic analysis of plastid trnK intron sequence data. Plant Biology 3(2): 164–175. 
  Meimberg, H. 2002. Molekular-systematische Untersuchungen an den Familien Nepenthaceae und Ancistrocladaceae sowie verwandter Taxa aus der Unterklasse Caryophyllidae s. l.. Ph.D. thesis, Ludwig Maximilian University of Munich, Munich. 
 Meimberg, H. & G. Heubl 2006. Introduction of a nuclear marker for phylogenetic analysis of Nepenthaceae. Plant Biology 8(6): 831–840. 
 Meimberg, H., S. Thalhammer, A. Brachmann & G. Heubl 2006. Comparative analysis of a translocated copy of the trnK intron in carnivorous family Nepenthaceae. Molecular Phylogenetics and Evolution 39(2): 478–490. 
 Whitten, T., S.J. Damanik, J. Anwar & N. Hisyam 2000. The Ecology of Sumatra. Periplus Editions, Hong Kong.

External links

Photographs of N. densiflora at the Carnivorous Plant Photofinder

densiflora
Endemic flora of Sumatra
Carnivorous plants of Asia
Taxa named by Benedictus Hubertus Danser